Azam Khodayari is a Paralympian athlete from Iran competing mainly in category F56/58 discus throw events.

She competed in the 2004 Summer Paralympics in Athens, Greece. There she won a bronze medal in the women's F56/58 discus throw event.

External links
 profile on paralympic.org

Paralympic athletes of Iran
Athletes (track and field) at the 2004 Summer Paralympics
Paralympic bronze medalists for Iran
Living people
Medalists at the 2004 Summer Paralympics
Year of birth missing (living people)
Paralympic medalists in athletics (track and field)
Iranian male discus throwers
21st-century Iranian people